KBAX-LD, virtual and UHF digital channel 27, is a low-powered MeTV-affiliated television station licensed to Twin Falls, Idaho, United States. The station is owned by Christian Broadcasting of Idaho, Inc.

Digital channels
The station's digital signal is multiplexed:

References

External links

Television stations in Idaho
Television channels and stations established in 1999
Low-power television stations in the United States
1999 establishments in Idaho